Boryspil is a city and the administrative center of Boryspil Raion in Kyiv Oblast (region) in northern and central Ukraine. It hosts the administration of Boryspil urban hromada, one of the hromadas of Ukraine. The population was estimated as

Name
Official sources state that the city derives its name from Prince Boris, of Boris and Gleb, two sons of Vladimir the Great, who were both murdered during the internecine wars of 1015–1019. According to Petro Tronko in his History of cities and villages in Ukrainian SSR, the locality where Boryspil is located was named as "Borysove pole" (Borys's field) when in 1015 a son of Vladimir the Great Borys returning from another raid against Pechenegs died from hands of hired assassins. Others state that the name of the city is of the Greek origin; it consists of two parts Borys from Borysthenes (the Greek name for Dnieper) and Pil from Polis (the Ukrainized version of the Greek word). The city also has a sister city, Hopkins, Minnesota, US.

History
The settlement is first mentioned in 1015 in connection with the internecine wars of 1015–1019, and later, in the 12th century, as part of the Kyivan Rus (Ruthenia). Sometime after the Mongol invasion, most of the Ruthenian territory belonged to the Grand Duchy of Lithuania. The site of the settlement belonged to the King's translator Soltan Albiyevich who in 1508 sold it to the Kyiv Saint Nicholas Hermitage. It is believed that it was then when the settlement received its modern name.

After the Union of Lublin, the southern regions of the Grand Duchy of Lithuania were passed over to the Polish Crown and in 1590 on decision of the Sejm of the Polish–Lithuanian Commonwealth, the settlement was given to Wojtech Czonowicki, a senior of the Registered Cossacks, who later participated in the Kosiński uprising. In 1596 the Polish King Sigismund III Vasa transformed the town into a royal estate and there was formed the Boryspol starostwo. Later the same year it was granted the Magdeburg rights (or possibly Lübeck law) and in the town was built a ratusz. The Boryspil town's coat of arms contained an image of Saint Stanislav (see Stanislaus of Szczepanów). With extinguishing the Nalyvaiko Uprising, the Boryspil starostwo was passed to Stanisław Żółkiewski and stayed as the Żółkiewski's family estate until the 1648 Khmelnytsky Uprising.

On 14 January 1752 the Hetman of Little Russia Kyrylo Rozumovsky has given the town in eternal possession to his brother-in-law Kyiv Colonel Yukhym Darahan.

On 2 June 1920 at the Battle of Boryspil Polish-Ukrainian Army defeated the Red Army.

Later in 1920 in the town was established the Soviet regime. There were created four collective farms (kolhoz): "Shevchenko Memorial", "Kirov Memorial", "Sickle and Mallet", "Victory".

The town suffered greatly during the Soviet organized Holodomor when between 1 January 1933 to 1 January 1934 only by official data perished 5,739 among which 266 were infants (less than a year old).

During World War II, Boryspil was occupied by the German Army from September 23, 1941 to September 23, 1943. Fierce battles were fought around the city during its capture and liberation. During the Nazi occupation, the airfield of the modern Boryspil International Airport was used as a camp for prisoners of war.

In 1956 Boryspil was officially granted the city status. Currently the city is home to the country's main and biggest airport, Boryspil International Airport (international code KBP) and some minor industry.

Prior to the country-wide administrative reform of 17 July 2020, Boryspil was incorporated as a city of oblast significance, and was not part of Boryspil Raion, even though the administrative centre of the raion was located there.

Climate

Infrastructure
Aerosvit Airlines had its head office on the grounds of Boryspil International Airport.

Around the city detours the main European route , particularly the Kyiv–Kharkiv highway (part of the national  route). Along  between Kyiv and Boryspil International Airport stretches a modernized motorway.

In the city also starts another national highway  which connects Boryspil with Zaporizhia.

Sports
It also hosts Ukrainian Premier League team Arsenal Kyiv at the Kolos Stadium.

Press
 "Trudova Slava" newspaper (since 1930)
 "Visti" newspaper (since 2000)

Notable people
People born in Boryspil
 Pavlo Chubynsky (1839–1884), author of the Ukrainian National Anthem
Vitalii Sediuk (b.1988), prankster and former television reporter
Okhrim Sudomora (1889-1968), graphic and poster artist, illustrator of Ukrainian literary and children's books

Gallery

See also

 Battle of Boryspil (1920)

References

External links
 "Visti" newspaper website 

 
Cities in Kyiv Oblast
Pereyaslavsky Uyezd
Cities of regional significance in Ukraine
Kyiv metropolitan area